Constel·lació Esportiva was an Andorran football club from Andorra La Vella. The team began play in the Andorran First Division (Campionat de Lliga) in 1998 and dominated the league in 2000, beating FC Encamp 6–0 in the championship.
That summer, the Andorran Football Federation accused the team of trying to buy players from other teams, there were financial irregularities, and the team did not want to divide its winnings from the UEFA cup with the league. The team was kicked out of the First Division for seven years.

Honours 
Campionat de Lliga: 1
 1999–00
Copa Constitució: 1
 1999–00

UEFA Cup

References 

Defunct football clubs in Andorra
Sport in Andorra la Vella
1998 establishments in Andorra
2000 disestablishments in Andorra
Association football clubs established in 1998
Association football clubs disestablished in 2000